Transient grating spectroscopy is an optical technique used to measure quasiparticle propagation. It can track changes in metallic materials as they are irradiated.

References

Time-resolved spectroscopy